Linxihe Township is an rural township in Sangzhi County, Zhangjiajie, Hunan Province, China.

Administrative division
The township is divided into 11 villages, the following areas: Zongshuyu Village, Linxiyuan Village, Zhangjiapu Village, Tianping Village, Jiahe Village, Siwei Village, Tianwan Village, Jianfengshan Village, Ma'anhui Village, Dadongxi Village, and Lutangwan Village (棕树峪村、淋溪源村、张家铺村、田坪村、夹河村、四围村、田湾村、尖丰山村、马安会村、大洞溪村、卢塘湾村).

References

External links

Former towns and townships of Sangzhi County